In Hinduism, Rishabha is one of the twenty-four avatars of Vishnu in the Bhagavata Purana. Some scholars state that this avatar is same as the first Tirthankara of Jainism. Shaiva texts like Linga Purana appropriated Tirthankar Rishabhdeva as an avatar of lord Shiva because 
his sign is bull and his nirvan place is mountain Ashtapad and the 1008 names of lord Shivas are same as Rishabhdeva  . Rishabha is also found in Vedic literature, where it means the "bull" and is an epithet for Rudra (Shiva).

According to John E. Cort and other scholars, there is a considerable overlap between Jain and Hindu Vaishnava traditions in western parts of India, with Hindus adopting Jain sacred figures in Hindu texts like Rishabha and his son Bharata.

In Jainism it is believed that Lord Rishabhadev is King Ikshvaku, the progenitor of the Suryavaṃśa .

Vedic Literature

The Vedas mention the name Rishabha. However, the context in the Rigveda, Atharvaveda and the Upanishads suggests that it means the bull, sometimes "any male animal" or "most excellent of any kind", or "a kind of medicinal plant".

According to Sarvepalli Radhakrishnan, a professor of comparative religions and philosophy at Oxford who later became the second President of India, there is evidence to show that Rishabha was being worshipped by the first century BCE. The Yajurveda, states Radhakrishnan, mentions the name of three Tirthankaras – Rishabha, Ajitanatha and Arishtanemi, and that "the Bhāgavata Purāṇa endorses the view that Rishabha was the founder of Jainism". It is an epithet for the bull in the Rigveda:

Translation:

Other examples of Rishabha appearing in the Vedic literature include verses 6.16.47 of Rigveda, 9.4.14–15 of Atharvaveda, 3.7.5.13 and 4.7.10.1 of Taittiriya Brahmana, etc.

See also
 Bharata Chakravartin

References

Bibliography
 
 
 

Avatars of Vishnu
Rishis
Jainism and other religions
Hinduism and other religions
Solar dynasty